Gena/Waugla Rural LLG is a local-level government (LLG) of Chimbu Province, Papua New Guinea.

Wards
01. Nogar
02. Mukuna
03. Bombir
04. Kendine
05. Kambang
06. Sim
07. Dimbinyaundo
08. Duglgambagl
09. Kunbi
10. Kombuku
11. Siambugla Waugku
12. Saimgugla Wauku
13. Genayogombo
14. Boomgate

References

Local-level governments of Chimbu Province